Heikki Flöjt (30 November 1943 – 30 September 2000) was a Finnish biathlete. He competed in the 4 x 7.5 kilometre relay event at the 1968 Winter Olympics.

References

External links
 

1943 births
2000 deaths
Finnish male biathletes
Olympic biathletes of Finland
Biathletes at the 1968 Winter Olympics
People from Kajaani
Sportspeople from Kainuu